Penzing  may refer to:
Penzing (Vienna), the 14th district of Vienna, Austria
Penzing (Vienna district part), a former independent suburb of Vienna, Austria
Penzing, a Katastralgemeinde of the municipality of Sieghartskirchen in Lower Austria
Penzing, Germany, a municipality near the Bavarian district of Landsberg am Lech in Germany
Penzing, a quarter of the municipality of Babensham in the district of Rosenheim in Bavaria, Germany